Alejandro Balde Martínez (born 18 October 2003) is a Spanish professional footballer who plays as a left-back for Barcelona Atlètic and the Spain national team.

Club career
Born in Barcelona, Catalonia, to a Guinean father and a Dominican mother, Balde joined FC Barcelona in 2011 at the age of eight after coming up through ranks at RCD Espanyol. In July 2021, he signed a contract renewal with Barcelona until 2024 with a release clause of 500 million euros.

Balde impressed during pre-season in the summer 2021, and began the new campaign as Jordi Alba's primary back-up at Camp Nou. He sat on the bench for the opening match against Real Sociedad and the next game against Athletic Bilbao.On 14 September 2021, he played his first official match for Barcelona's first team replacing Alba in the 74th minute of a 3–0 loss to Bayern Munich in the group stage of the UEFA Champions League.

From the start of 2022–23 season, Balde was given a more prominent role by coach Xavi, starting in more league matches than Jordi Alba and receiving more minutes in important matches.

International career
Balde received a surprised call up to the Spain national team two days before the start of the 2022 FIFA World Cup, as fellow left-back José Gayà had injured his ankle in training. On 23 November 2022, he made his first international appearance in a 7–0 win against Costa Rica, substituting Jordi Alba in the 64th minute.

Career statistics

Club

International

Honours
Barcelona
Supercopa de España: 2022–23

References

External links

FC Barcelona official profile

2003 births
Living people
Footballers from Barcelona
Spanish footballers
Spain youth international footballers
Spain under-21 international footballers
Spain international footballers
Spanish sportspeople of African descent
Spanish people of Bissau-Guinean descent
Spanish people of Dominican Republic descent
Sportspeople of Dominican Republic descent
Association football defenders
La Liga players
Primera Federación players
Segunda División B players
FC Barcelona Atlètic players
FC Barcelona players
2022 FIFA World Cup players